Aneilema acuminatum is a species of herbaceous plant in the family Commelinaceae. It is native to New Guinea, Maluku, Solomon Islands, Queensland, New South Wales. Its natural habitat consists of rainforest, riparian forests and moist areas within drier forests and woodlands.

References

acuminatum
Flora of the Maluku Islands
Flora of Papuasia
Flora of Queensland
Flora of New South Wales
Plants described in 1810